The International Academy of Design and Technology (IADT) was a private for-profit media arts college in the United States with over ten branches. It was owned by Career Education Corporation. The institution was briefly merged with Sanford-Brown in 2014 before being closed in 2015.

History
In 1977, Clem Stein, Jr. founded the International Academy of Merchandising and Design, Ltd in Chicago. The first branch opened in Tampa, Florida in 1984.
Other Branches were opened in other major U.S cities, early on including a Toronto, Canada location.
The college changed its name in 1999 and 2000 to reflect expanded design and technology programs.

In June 2007, CEC announced that the Pittsburgh, Pa and Fairmont, WV campus of IADT would close in 2008. Later, on 11 December 2007, it was announced that IADT Toronto would close in March 2009.

The Toronto location had grown very large from is small beginnings in the mid 1980s, and included programs in Fashion Design, Interior Design, and by the mid 1990s programs in video editing, 3D Animation and design, and later Film production. IADT Toronto owners petitioned the provincial Ontario Ministry of Education and Training to allow it provide university degrees for its programs like that provided to similar branches and other companies similar to IADT in the United States. This was rejected by the Ontario Government as post secondary education, especially university level education is highly guarded by provincial governments in Canada. The owners quickly sold off the IADT Toronto programs to RCC Institute of Technology by the end of 2008. It was rebranded as The Academy of Design, using similar graphic branding.

In April 2010, CEC faced a large civil suit from previous students from IADT Pittsburgh, IADT WV, and IADT Toronto citing registration fraud, improper credit transfers, and false pretense. The previous students won the civil suit with an undisclosed amount offered.

In 2011, CEC settled a class action lawsuit claiming violations of the Telephone Consumer Protection Act. IADT had sent out approximately 100,000 unsolicited text message advertisements in 2008. A $20 million settlement fund was established.

In 2014, CEC announced that it would merge IADT all its other educational divisions under the Sanford-Brown name. The merged institution closed in 2015.

Academics
Locations throughout the United States and Canada offered associate's degree and bachelor's degree courses in game design, merchandising, advertising & design, fashion design & marketing, interior design, digital photography, digital production, digital movie production, and computer animation.

IADT was accredited by the Accrediting Council for Independent Colleges and Schools (ACICS).  However, IADT did not have regional accreditation, thus many regionally accredited schools are unlikely to accept their credits in transfer or recognize their degrees for entry into graduate programs. It is up to the accepting institution to make the final decision on the transferability of credits.

Notable alumni 
 Ashley A. Woods, comic artist
 Kate Hewko, founder + CEO of the eponymous fashion brand

References

External links
Official website

Graphic design schools in the United States
Former for-profit universities and colleges in the United States
Colleges accredited by the Accrediting Council for Independent Colleges and Schools
Career Education Corporation
Defunct private universities and colleges in Illinois
Educational institutions established in 1977
1977 establishments in Illinois
Educational institutions disestablished in 2015
2015 disestablishments in Illinois